Seh Payeh-e Ziarat-e Gonbad (also Romanized as Seh Pāyeh-e Zīārat-e Gonbad; also known as Seh Pāyeh-e Zīārat) is a village in Dalgan Rural District, in the Central District of Dalgan County, Sistan and Baluchestan Province, Iran. At the 2006 census, its population was 542, in 97 families.

References 

Populated places in Dalgan County